Guillaume Plessis (born 16 January 1985) is a former professional footballer who played as a midfielder.

Club career
Plessis started his career with Lens. In January 20005, he joined Premier League club Everton on a six-month deal but failed to make a first team appearance. He has also played for Clermont Foot and Martigues.

International career
Plessis was part of the France U17 squad for the 2002 UEFA European Under-17 Championship.

Personal life
Plessis's younger brother Damien was also a professional footballer.

References

External links

French footballers
Footballers from Réunion
RC Lens players
Everton F.C. players
Clermont Foot players
US Boulogne players
FC Martigues players
Ligue 2 players
1985 births
Living people
France youth international footballers
AS Béziers Hérault (football) players
Association football midfielders